Leptachatina is a genus of small air-breathing land snails, terrestrial pulmonate gastropod mollusks in the family Amastridae.

Species
Species within the genus Leptachatina include:
 Leptachatina lepida

References

 Nomenclator Zoologicus info

 
Amastridae
Taxonomy articles created by Polbot